"Life Don't Be So Hard" is a song recorded by American country music artist Tracy Lawrence.  It was released in September 2001 as the first single from the album Tracy Lawrence.  The song reached #36 on the Billboard Hot Country Singles & Tracks chart.  The song was written by Casey Beathard and Kenny D. West.

Chart performance

References

2001 singles
2001 songs
Tracy Lawrence songs
Songs written by Casey Beathard
Warner Records singles